Howey Place, formerly known as "Cole's Walk" is a shopping arcade in Melbourne, Victoria. It is a short, narrow covered laneway, running south from Little Collins Street between Swanston Street and Elizabeth Street in the central business district of Melbourne.

Located in the heart of the shopping precinct, Howey Place is currently flanked with small designer fashion shops. It joins with the Collins234 Boutique Place, a shopping mall at 234 Collins Street which runs through to Collins Street, as well forming an "L" shape toward the back of the Capitol Arcade which connects it with Swanston Street.

Motor vehicles are restricted access.

History
Before 1896, Howey Place was just a drab lane. In 1896, Edward William Cole, the developer of the famous Cole's Book Arcade, covered the lane with a glass canopy and created glass showcases along the street to attract tenants which included a Cole's wholesale bookstore, a toy department store and printing shop.

In the 1920s, the streamline moderne Presgrave building was incorporated into the lane.

Howey House, a tall art-deco building and part of the Collins Street in the 1930s once connected the lane to Collins Street via an open laneway, however Howey House was demolished in the 1980s for the construction of the Sportsgirl Centre, a modern shopping mall. Howey Place is named after Henry Howey who bought the land for £128 in 1837. After he and his family drowned on passage from Sydney, his property passed to his brother John Werge Howey and finally to his son Captain John Edwards Presgrave Howey. JEP Howey is best remembered as the man who built the Romney, Hythe & Dymchurch Railway in Kent, England.

References

Streets in Melbourne City Centre
Shopping arcades in Australia
Shopping centres in Melbourne
Heritage sites in Melbourne